Ossetian cuisine ( Iron khɐrinɐgtɐ) refers to the cooking styles and dishes of the Ossetians.

Ossetian pie 

Fydzhin is a type of meat pie.

Three pies is an important concept in Ossetian culture, representing  sun, earth and water.

Ossetian beer 

Beer has been prepared and enjoyed in Ossetia since ancient times. Eeron Bagany is a famous beer festival celebrating this cultural treasure in a manner comparable to that of the German Oktoberfest.

Ossetian cheese 
Ossetian cheese is a traditional cheese of Ossetians.

References

External links 
 Ossetian traditional pies
 Ossetian feta cheese
 

South Ossetian culture